Leonard L. Martino (March 17, 1925 - February 19, 2021) was a Democratic member of the Pennsylvania House of Representatives.

He was born in Butler to Michael and Angela Ditullio Martino.

References

Democratic Party members of the Pennsylvania House of Representatives
2021 deaths
1925 births
People from Butler, Pennsylvania